The Blackburn House (also known as the Blackburn-Mastich House) is a historic residence near Athens, Alabama.  The house was built around 1873.  It is a one-and-a-half-story Saltbox-style house with an Italianate portico.  The portico has four chamfered edge columns supporting a hipped roof.  The portico is flanked by two-over-two sash windows on each floor; the same windows are used on the sides on the first floor and for the front rooms on the second floor.  Small casement windows are found above the portico and in the attic areas on the rear sides of the house.  The house has a center-hall plan with four rooms on the ground floor and two on the upper floor.  Since restoration in the early 1980s, the house has served as an antique store.  The house was listed on the Alabama Register of Landmarks and Heritage in 1983 and the National Register of Historic Places in 1984.

References

National Register of Historic Places in Limestone County, Alabama
Houses on the National Register of Historic Places in Alabama
Saltbox architecture in the United States
Italianate architecture in Alabama
Houses completed in 1873
Houses in Limestone County, Alabama
Properties on the Alabama Register of Landmarks and Heritage